National Socialist Movement "Slavic Union" was a Russian neo-Nazi organization founded in 1999 by Dmitry Demushkin. In 2010, it was banned by the Moscow City Court.

History
Slavic Union was founded in September 1999 by Dmitry Demushkin.

Slavic Union was banned by the Moscow City Court on 27 April 2010 following charges by prosecutors that the group promotes national socialism with "ideas similar to the ideology of Nazi Germany". Responding to the ban on 27 April, Demushkin noted that the Slavic Union had been "banned all across Russia" and indicated that an appeal to higher legal authority of the organization's prohibition would "definitely" be forthcoming. Since then, the group has remained active underground.

In September 2010 information surfaced that the organization allegedly has opened offices in Norway. This was reported when Viacheslav Datsik showed up at Norwegian immigration authorities requesting political asylum. Datsik had shortly before escaped from a mental institution near Saint Petersburg and was believed to have reached Norway on board an arms-trafficking vessel. Together with two other persons he was arrested by Norwegian police on suspicion of having possible links to organized crime.

Footnotes

Further reading

 Semyon Charny, "Racism, xenophobia, ethnic discrimination and anti-Semitism in Russia (January-June 2005)," Summarized review. Moscow Bureau for Human Rights.

External links
 

1999 establishments in Russia
Holocaust denial in Russia
Neo-Nazism in Russia
Political parties established in 1999
Pan-Slavism
Fascist parties in Russia
Russian nationalist organizations
Far-right political parties in Russia
Banned far-right parties
Banned political parties in Russia
Defunct nationalist parties in Russia
Neo-Nazi political parties in Europe
Defunct far-right parties
Fascism in Russia
Political parties disestablished in 2010
2010 disestablishments in Russia